

Rudolf Hofmann (4 September 1895 – 13 April 1970) was a German general during World War II and a recipient of Knight's Cross of the Iron Cross.

Awards and decorations

 Knight's Cross of the Iron Cross on 7 May 1945 as General der Infanterie and Chief of the Generalstab Heeresgruppe Nord

References

Citations

Bibliography

 

1895 births
1970 deaths
Military personnel from Würzburg
People from the Kingdom of Bavaria
German Army personnel of World War I
German Army generals of World War II
Generals of Infantry (Wehrmacht)
Recipients of the clasp to the Iron Cross, 1st class
Recipients of the Gold German Cross
Recipients of the Knight's Cross of the Iron Cross
German prisoners of war in World War II